Sipaneeae is a tribe of flowering plants in the family Rubiaceae and contains about 43 species in 10 genera. Its representatives are found from Central to Southern Tropical America.

Genera 
Currently accepted names

 Chalepophyllum Hook.f. (1 sp) - Guyana, Venezuela
 Dendrosipanea Ducke (2 sp) - Southern Venezuela, Northern Brazil
 Limnosipanea Hook.f. (3 sp) - Panama to Southern Tropical America
 Maguireothamnus Steyerm. (2 sp) - Guyana, Venezuela (+ Northern Brazil?)
 Neblinathamnus Steyerm. (2 sp) - Venezuela, Northern Brazil
 Neobertiera Wernham (4 sp) - French Guiana, Guyana
 Pteridocalyx Wernham (2 sp) - Guyana
 Sipanea Aubl. (19 sp) - Trinidad to Central & Southern Tropical America
 Sipaneopsis Steyerm. (7 sp) - Colombia, Southern Venezuela, Northern Brazil
 Steyermarkia Standl. (1 sp) - South-Eastern Mexico, Guatemala

Synonyms

 Ptychodea Willd. ex Cham. & Schltdl. = Sipanea
 Sipania Seem. = Limnosipanea
 Virecta L.f. = Sipanea

References 

 
Ixoroideae tribes